Nura may refer to:

Places
 Nura (river), a river in Kazakhstan
 Nura District, a district in Kazakhstan 
 Nura, Kyrgyzstan, a village in Kyrgyzstan
 Nursu, or Nura, a village in Azerbaijan
 Nura, Kazakhstan, a number of villages in Kazakhstan
 Nura, Nura District, a district capital in Kazakhstan 
 Nura, Yrgyz District, a village in Kazakhstan

People
Nura (rapper) (born 1988), German rapper
Nura M Inuwa (born 1989), Nigerian poet and musician, also known as Nura
 Nura al-Faiz (born 1956), first woman to hold cabinet-level office in Saudi Arabia
 Nura Woodson Ulreich (1899–1950), American author, illustrator, and artist whose pen name was Nura

Other uses
 Nura: Rise of the Yokai Clan, a 2008 manga and anime series
Nura (company),  an Australian headphone company

See also
 Nura Nal, a comics character
 Nora (disambiguation)
 Noora (disambiguation)